Gorkhapatra Sansthan is Nepal's national media house owned and operated by the Government of Nepal.

Publications
Gorkhapatra
Madupark
Muna
The Rising Nepal
Yubamanch

References

Publishing companies of Nepal
1963 establishments in Nepal